David Graham was the pen name of Evan (or Wilbur) Wright (1919–1994), a British crime fiction author who is mainly remembered for his post-apocalyptic novel, Down to a Sunless Sea.

Bibliography
David Graham served with the RAF as a fighter pilot during World War 2, and subsequently as a flying instructor. He later worked as a technical author for a hovercraft company.

Novels

As David Graham
Down to a Sunless Sea (1979)
Sidewall (1983)
Seven Years to Sunset (1985)

As Wilbur Wright
Carter's Castle (1983)
Now Centurion (1991)

References

1919 births
1994 deaths
British crime fiction writers
20th-century British novelists